Pedro Manuel Venturo Zapata was the CEO of "Hacienda Higuereta y Anexos - Negociacion Vinicola Pedro Venturo S.A." from 1925 to 1952.

Creation and Construction 

(1539) When establishing the doctrine of the town of Surco. The parish jurisdiction was placed under the order of St. James the Apostle. 
The proximity of the Hacienda Higuereta to the sea, good winds, pastures and backwaters turned it into a sort of village of rest for the inhabitants of Lima, from viceroys to officers and officials of all kinds.

(1800) The grounds of the Hacienda Higuereta (which owes its name to the thriving fruit industry of the area) and of the Hacienda Vista Alegre were going through many 
owners, from Colonial to the Republic. From Don Manuel Martinez of Aparicio (1792-1850), Count Montecarmelo, to ultimately be acquired by an Italian immigrant Don Pedro Venturo Toledo.

Pedro Venturo Zapata (Owner/CEO 1925-1952) 

(1925) Don Pedro Venturo Zapata acquired "The Hacienda Higuereta" from his father who died that same year. He led the Hacienda to serious levels of productivity of pisco, Brandy, Cognac, Champagne, red and white wine (Albilla Superior, Oporto, Moscato Dulce), Vermouth and other products such as balsamic vinegar, Grape Juice and Martini. 
He also raised livestock finance, with over 300 holstein cows, 2 bulls named Ambrosio and Churchill, chickens, turkeys and pigs, They produced eggs, milk and meat for the community.  Don Pedro Venturo was also one of the largest breeders of the Peruvian Paso Horse.
He was an honorary member of various labor organizations and he improved living conditions and planned social assistance, according to modern trends in his "Hacienda Higuereta", building houses for workers and employees; endowing the negotiation of sports fields, venue for film shows.
The Hacienda was in some ways a small town with homes for the employees and their families, a school, a movie theater with mezzanine for trusted employees, a park, a wood shed, a machine shop a pool, soccer fields, a chapel, a bodega, public restrooms and of course the buildings where the wine and pisco were crushed, distilled and aged.
Don Venturo worked with organizations to provide the population with the abundant food and elements of sports and healthy recreation.
He was a member of the Wine Committee of the National Agrarian Society and organizer of the Advisory Mission, in 1930, to study the law of alcoholic beverages and promotion of national viticulture.He organized the first Harvest Festival in Peru called "La Vendimia", chairing the Organizing Committee in 1937 in Santiago de Surco. La Vendimia Wine Festival continues today.

(1956) The Hacienda Higuereta was located near an airfield, and in 1956, the unavoidable happened—a plane crashed on the grounds of the Hacienda during a practice run.

The Hacienda is Demolished 

After Don Venturo's Death in 1952, the company and hacienda were split and sold to different investors. In 1967 General Juan Velasco Alvarado took power with armed forces in a coup d'État against President Fernando Belaúnde Terry 
During General Velasco's reign from 1968 to 1975, he restructured parts of Peru.  One of his mandates was an agrarian reform program to expropriate farms and diversify land ownership, much of which had been concentrated in Haciendas' owned by a small percentage of the population. 
Hacienda Higuereta was on his target. Under new Peruvian government law any hacienda that is not producing what the quota mandates 
must be destroyed. Hacienda Higuereta was ordered to be torn down.

Former populated places in Peru